Richard John Bing (October 12, 1909 in Nuremberg, Germany – November 8, 2010 in La Cañada Flintridge, California) was a cardiologist who made significant contributions to his field of study. He was elected to the American Philosophical Society in 1995.

Early life and education
Born in Nuremberg to a hops merchant and a professional singer, he studied at the Conservatory at the Nuremberg Gymnasium but also took an interest in medicine. Trying to determine which path to take, after an indifferent reception from Richard Strauss and being inspired by Arrowsmith, he went into medicine, earning a degree at the University of Munich in 1934. His family—who were Jewish—left Nazi Germany shortly thereafter, and he studied further at the University of Bern, and was awarded another medical degree in 1935.

Career as cardiologist
Bing then took a fellowship in Copenhagen at the Carlsberg Biological Institute. There he was visited by the Nobel prize-winning surgeon Alexis Carrel and aviator Charles Lindbergh. From that meeting came an invitation to work at the Rockefeller Institute in New York on the early development of machine perfusion. Following his work at the Rockefeller Institute, he took a position in physiology at the Columbia University College of Physicians and Surgeons, where he worked under Allen Whipple.

He took an assistant residency at Johns Hopkins University in order to allow him to join the Medical Corps. After two years in the Corps, he returned to Hopkins as a junior faculty member. There, he did pioneering research into cardiac metabolism, enabling the accurate measurement of the effects of drugs and drug candidates on the heart. After stints at Washington University in St. Louis and Wayne State University, he moved to California, and joined the Huntington Medical Research Institutes. There, he continued research, studying the chemistry of heart attacks, developing techniques for high-speed photography of the coronary vessels, and measurement of blood flow using nitric oxide.

Bing was life president of the International Society for Heart Research, having helped establish the group that evolved into that organization. He continued work into his 90s, and published more than 500 academic papers and books. Continuing his interest in music, he also wrote 300 works of music and five works of fiction.

Personal life/death
Bing married Mary Whipple, the daughter of his supervisor at Columbia, in 1938 (died in 1990), and had two sons and two daughters; His daughter Barbara Bing died in 1999. He was the subject of a short 2009 documentary, Para Fuera: A Portrait of Dr. Richard J. Bing. He died November 8, 2010, aged 101.

References

See also
 
 
 
 Hell J Nucl Med, Vol. 13, No. 3, Sept. - Dec. 2010.

1909 births
2010 deaths
American centenarians
Men centenarians
American cardiologists
Physicians from Nuremberg
Bavarian emigrants to the United States
Columbia University faculty
Jewish emigrants from Nazi Germany to the United States
Jewish American scientists
University of Bern alumni
Ludwig Maximilian University of Munich alumni
United States Army Medical Corps officers
Commanders Crosses of the Order of Merit of the Federal Republic of Germany
21st-century American Jews
Members of the American Philosophical Society
Washington University School of Medicine faculty
Wayne State University faculty